Dame Elizabeth Wordsworth  (1840–1932) was founding Principal of Lady Margaret Hall, Oxford and she funded and founded St Hugh's College. She was also an author, sometimes writing under the name Grant Lloyd.

Life

Wordsworth was born in 1840 at Harrow on the Hill and she was educated at home, she learned several modern languages as well as (self taught) Latin and Greek though her knowledge of science and mathematics was meagre. She had a "persevering familiarity" with the Greek testament, as well as the Iliad, which she read at the rate of fifty lines a day with the help of a Latin translation. Her mother was Susanna Hatley Frere and her father Christopher Wordsworth was a headmaster and later the Bishop of Lincoln. Her brothers were John Wordsworth, Bishop of Salisbury, and Christopher Wordsworth, a liturgical scholar. She travelled on European family trips and she was brought up in the cloisters of Westminster Abbey and in Stanford in the Vale in Berkshire. She was the great-niece of the poet William Wordsworth.

She was the founding Principal of Lady Margaret Hall, Oxford in 1879 as a college for female undergraduates, on Norham Gardens in North Oxford. She continued in this role until her retirement in 1909, when she was succeeded by Henrietta Jex-Blake.

In 1886 she inherited some money from her father and founded St Hugh's College also in north Oxford as a college for poorer female undergraduates unable to afford the costs of Lady Margaret Hall. Today this is one of the largest colleges in the University of Oxford.

In 1896 she was one of the women who was called to give evidence to the Hebdomadal Council on the question of whether women should be awarded degrees at the University of Oxford, making her one of the first women to appear before this council. She believed that women's education at Oxford should be as close to that of men as possible, although she did not believe in their being entered for University prizes, due to the risk of overstimulation. She received an honorary M.A. from Oxford in 1921, shortly after degrees were opened to women, and an honorary D.C.L. in 1928.

She was a prolific author, writing poetry, plays, biographies and religious articles, as well as writing and lecturing on women's education. She published the novels Thornwell Abbas, (two volumes, 1876) and Ebb and Flow, (two volumes, 1883) under the pseudonym of Grant Lloyd. She wrote a song "Good and Clever", which like her books came out of copyright in 2002.

Works include
Thornwell Abbas, (two volumes, 1876)
Ebb and Flow, (two volumes, 1883)
Christopher Wordsworth, Bishop of Lincoln, 1807-1885, with John Henry Overton, (1888)
William Wordsworth, (1891)

See also
 Madeleine Shaw Lefevre, Wordsworth's counterpart at Somerville Hall.

Further reading
Olivia Robinson and Alison Moulds published " Women in Oxford's History: Elizabeth Wordsworth" in 2016

References

External links
 

1840 births
1932 deaths
English philanthropists
Dames Commander of the Order of the British Empire
People from Harrow on the Hill
Principals of Lady Margaret Hall, Oxford
Elizabeth
Founders of colleges of the University of Oxford